Frank Christian (born Frank P. Caputo, October 19, 1952 – December 24, 2012) was an American, Greenwich Village-based singer-songwriter and guitarist. His best-known song, "Three Flights Up" was recorded by Nanci Griffith for her Grammy award-winning 1992 release Other Voices, Other Rooms.

Christian also had much success as a sideman.  He appeared on dozens of albums, backing such performers as Dave Van Ronk, Suzanne Vega, John Gorka, Nanci Griffith, and The Smithereens.

He began his guitar studies with the jazz guitarist Roosevelt Span.

He was a guitar teacher in New York City. Christian used to quip that if a person had studied blues guitar with Dave van Ronk and had absorbed everything Dave could teach them but still wanted to learn more, van Ronk would then send them to study with Frank Christian.

Discography
 Somebody's Got to Do it (Great Divide, 1982)
 Where Were You Last Night (Gazell, 1992)
 From My Hands (Palmetto, 1995)
 Mister So and So (Palmetto, 1996)

As guest
 Nanci Griffith, Others Voices Other Rooms (Elektra, 1993)
 Nanci Griffith, Flyer (Elektra, 1994)
 Nanci Griffith, Dust Bowl Symphony (Elektra, 1999)
 The Smithereens, Especially for You (Enigma, 1986)
 Suzanne Vega, Suzanne Vega (A&M, 1985)
 Suzanne Vega, Solitude Standing (A&M, 1987)
 Dave Van Ronk, Sweet and Lowdown (Justin Time, 2001)
 Jack Hardy, White Shoes (Great Divide, 1982)

References

External links
Illustrated Frank Christian discography

1952 births
2012 deaths
American male singer-songwriters
American folk guitarists
American male guitarists
People from Greenwich Village
Fast Folk artists
Palmetto Records artists
20th-century American guitarists
20th-century American male musicians
Singer-songwriters from New York (state)